The Qerveh Spacious Mosque is one of the monuments of Qerveh. This mosque is also known as a Jama Mosque, and is one of the works of the Seljuk period (5th century AH).

See also
 Islam in Iran

References

Mosques in Iran
Mosque buildings with domes
Abhar County
National works of Iran
Qerveh